Hoai Pham (born November 1967) is Vietnamese-born American dealer at the Village Club Casino, in Chula Vista, California who won the first event of the 2010 World Series of Poker---the $500 Casino Employee Championship.  Pham plays poker primarily online and prefers the games of seven-card stud and pot-limit Omaha.

World Series of Poker bracelets
He won total amount of $71,424 in 2010 World Series of Poker.

References

External links
 Poke News Profile

American poker players
World Series of Poker bracelet winners
1967 births
Living people
People from Chula Vista, California